Waltz the second EP released by the Australian indie rock band Augie March. It was first released in August 1999. It includes the first appearance of the band's early hit "Asleep in Perfection". A music video was also issued for the closing track, "The Moth Ball".

At the ARIA Music Awards of 2000, the EP was nominated for ARIA Award for Breakthrough Artist – Single.

Track listing
 "Asleep in Perfection" (4:05)
 "None Shall Pass" (5:26)
 "Rich Girl" (4:57)
 "Departure" (4:47)
 "The Moth Ball" (5:46)

Charts

References

1999 EPs
EPs by Australian artists
Augie March albums